Darband-e Zard, also rendered as Darvand-e Zard, may refer to:
 Darband-e Zard-e Olya
 Darband-e Zard-e Sofla